Virginijus Pikturna (born 23 March 1961) is a Lithuanian politician. In 1990, he was among those who signed the Act of the Re-Establishment of the State of Lithuania.

See also
Politics of Lithuania

References

External links
 Biography 

1961 births
Living people
20th-century Lithuanian politicians
Place of birth missing (living people)